Josephus "Jos" Elisabeth A. M. Geysels (born 20 September 1952 in Turnhout) is a former Belgian (Flemish) politician, and former Representative in the Belgian Chamber for the ecologist party Agalev for which he was party chairman.  He resigned from the post in 2003, taking responsibility for the party's loss of power in the elections.

Geysels obtained a degree in Sociology at the University of Antwerp.

References

Groen (political party) politicians
Living people
1952 births
University of Antwerp alumni